The Association for Rural & Small Libraries (ARSL) is a non-profit organization based in the United States that promotes libraries, especially libraries which serve small and rural communities. It is a professional organization that believes in the value of rural and small libraries and strives to create resources and services that address national, state, and local priorities for libraries situated in rural communities.

History

Foundations of the Association, 1982-2007 
The oldest document on record for the Association for Rural & Small Libraries (ARSL) indicates that the Association was established in 1982.  Its founder was Dr. Bernard Vavrek, Director of the Center for the Study of Rural Librarianship (CSRL) at Clarion University in Pennsylvania. In its early years ARSL’s membership consisted primarily of library and information science students. Each year that membership grew and broadened to include librarians and library workers from rural and small libraries throughout the country.

National Growth, 2007-2020 
ARSL  was “home” at Clarion until 2007, when it moved away from the University to its new headquarters in Lexington, Kentucky. ARSL Board Members held a meeting in January 2007 at Clarion to determine the new “shape” of ARSL.  Discussions included enlarging the Board, revising the committee structure, and reviewing guiding documents as a foundation for future services.  As an outgrowth of that strategic planning meeting a course was set and, since then, the strategic plan is updated annually to reflect member needs and remain relevant to the ARSL Mission and Objectives.

At that time the group made a small but important change to their name: from the Association of Rural and Small Libraries to the Association for Rural and Small Libraries. This reflected their openness to welcoming members from beyond the immediate professional sphere of rural and small librarianship and their increased focus on providing professional development tools for the entire rural and small library community. In 2008 ARSL became an official American Library Association (ALA) Affiliate Organization. In 2017 ARSL headquarters was once again relocated to Whitehall, Michigan.

Evolving Leadership, 2020-Present 
In the fall of 2017 the Board of Directors issued a request for proposals to assess their organizational structure and make recommendations for improvements. The board’s action was precipitated by growing concerns about the sustainability of the association in the face of rapid growth. ARSL’s 14+ person Board was at that time responsible for all strategic decisions and almost all operational functions, with Board members chairing all of the major committees.

In May 2018 Primary Source, a small agency in Washington state that provides consultation and services specifically for libraries and library-support organizations, was retained by the ARSL board to provide the requested analysis. Through that analysis the Board decided to realign their leadership structure to better serve the needs of the Association’s members. The Board hired ARSL’s first-ever Executive Director, Kate Laughlin, to manage the administrative operations of the Association in January 2020. The Association’s headquarters were moved from Michigan to Seattle, Washington as part of this change. They also adjusted their Board structure, shrinking from 14 members to 9 (along with two ex-officio nonvoting members) and replacing the generic Member at Large seats with four Regional Directors to help ensure more nationally representative leadership. Responsibility for policy development and program implementation was delegated to the major committees.

Presidents of ARSL, 2007/08 - Present 
 2007- 2008 – Don Reynolds
 2008 - 2009 – Patty Hector
 2009 – 2010 – Timothy Owens
 2010 – 2011 – Sonja Plummer-Morgan
 2011 – 2012 – Becky Heil
 2012 - 2013 – Andrea Berstler
 2013 - 2014 - Tena Hanson
 2014 - 2015 - Donna Brice
 2015 - 2016 - Jet Kofoot
 2016 - 2017 - Judy Calhoun
 2017 - 2018 - Kieran Hixon
 2018 - 2019 - Lisa Lewis
 2019 - 2020 - Jennifer Pearson
 2020 - 2021 - Kathy Zappitello

Membership
Membership in ARSL is open to anyone person or organization, but most of its members are libraries or librarians.  Additionally, members are library staff, library board members, professional consultants, volunteers and library related organizations. Members are primarily from the United States, but there are some international members.

Governing structure
The Association for Rural & Small Libraries is a 501(c)(3) non-profit entity, governed by a set of bylaws which are administered by a duly elected board of directors. These 11 men and women serve terms of up to three years with the ability to be re-elected once.  The Executive Committee of the Board, composed of the Immediate Past President, President, Vice-President, Secretary and Treasurer, is empowered to administrate certain responsibilities.  Policies and programs are managed by various committees.

Committees
ARSL is a volunteer-driven organization. With the exception of some administrative functions, ARSL’s work is a result of a dedicated group of volunteers who meet regularly to discuss the goals and priorities of the Association.

Advocacy & Partnership Committee
This committee works on formalizing and maintaining board-approved partnerships that provide opportunities for ARSL members.  Assuring that each partnership received regular updates and is of mutual benefit to both organizations. They also engage in regular advocacy efforts on behalf of the organization and promote individual advocacy opportunities to our members.

Conference Committee
This committee is responsible for ensuring the timely planning of ARSL's annual conference in cooperation with the ARSL administrative office. The committee's work includes recruitment of keynote speakers and presenters.

Finance Committee
This committee creates ARSL's annual organization budget, which is reviewed and adopted by the Board of Directors.  It is also charged with forecasting revenues and expenditures based on organizational strategic goals.

Governance Committee
This committee oversees the revision and maintenance of the Association's governing documents, including its policies and bylaws. This committee meets as needed to review proposed revisions to those documents before submitting them to the ARSL Board for consideration.

Elections & Nominations Committee
This committee is composed of the Immediate Past President, the current President and the Vice-President, this committee determines the eligibility of candidates for the annual Board election.

Marketing & Communication Committee
This committee is responsible for curating the Association's public voice in print and on social media. They develop campaigns to promote the work of Association and help to attract new members.

Scholarship Committee
This committee convenes annually to coordinate the selection of recipients of ARSL's four conference scholarships: the Dr. Bernard Vavrek Scholarship for current LIS students; the Founders Scholarship for early-career library professionals; the Ken Davenport Scholarship for mid-career library professionals; and the ARSL Angels scholarship for ARSL members.

Conferences
With a focus on practical, "out of the box" workshops, presentations are geared toward the small and rural library audience. Practical, hands-on, and how-to formats are preferred. Prior to ARSL’s formation, the Center for the Study of Rural Librarianship at Clarion University in Clarion, PA sponsored conferences that were held throughout the US (1990-1999).  From 2001-2007, ARSL’s annual conference was held in Columbus, Ohio, and depended heavily on the Center for financial and logistical support.

For three years (2004-2006), conferences were held in conjunction with the Association for Bookmobile and Outreach Services (ABOS). In response to member requests and to provide greater access by more rural library participants, the decision was made in 2007 to hold the annual meeting and conference in different states and geographic regions.

The 2020 conference became ARSL’s first ever fully-virtual conference as a result of the COVID-19 pandemic. It was originally scheduled to be held in Wichita, KS.

Conference Locations and Partners, 2008-Present 

 2008 - Sacramento, CA | California State Library
 2009 - Gatlinburg, TN | Tennessee State Library and Archives
 2010 - Denver, CO | Joint Conference with the Association for Bookmobile and Outreach Services (ABOS) | Colorado State Library, Colorado Library Consortium, Bibliographic Center for Research
 2011 - Frisco, TX | University of North Texas
 2012 - Raleigh, NC | State Library of North Carolina
 2013 - Omaha, NE | Nebraska Library Association, Iowa Small Library Association
 2014 - Tacoma, WA | Washington State Library
 2015 - Little Rock, AR | Arkansas Library Association
 2016 - Fargo, ND | North Dakota State Library, Minnesota Department of Education State Library Services
 2017 - St. George, UT | Utah State Library
 2018 - Springfield, IL | Illinois State Library
 2019 - Burlington, VT | State Library of Vermont
 2020 - Virtual (previously Wichita, KS)
 2021 - Reno/Sparks, NV
 2022 - Chattanooga, TN
 2023 - Wichita, KS

See also
 Library Bill of Rights
 Library Hall of Fame
 Public library advocacy

External links
 Center for the Study of Rural Librarianship
 Association of Bookmobile & Outreach Services
 Clarion University

References

Library associations in the United States